The Gungahlin Eagles is a rugby union club based in Gungahlin, Australian Capital Territory.

Club history
The club was founded as the Daramalan RUFC club in 1967, going on to win two premierships. In 1999 the club moved to Gungahlin, where the club has continued to grow, including winning the 2003 premiership.
 1967        Entered Sub-District Competition; B Grade Minor Premiership and Premiers
 1969        Entered District Competition in 4th Grade; Won Minor Premiership
 1970        3rd Grade Minor Premiership and Premiers
 1973        Attained 1st Grade status; Jon Hardy first Senior Representative
 1975        Club Champions; 1st Grade Pre-season Knockout winners
 1976        Sub-District Premiers (Quinn Cup); first time in 1st Grade semi-finals
 1978        Club Champions; Reserve Grade Minor Premiership; 4th Grade Minor Premiership and Premiers
 1980        3rd Grade Premiers
 1981        Club Champions; Reserve Grade Minor Premiership and Premiers; 1st Grade Pre-season Knockout winners
 1982        Club Champions; Reserve Grade, 3rd Grade and 4th Grade Minor Premiership; 3rd Grade Premiers; first time in 1st Grade Grand Final
 1983        Club Champions; 1st Grade Minor Premiership; Reserve Grade and 3rd Grade Premiers; 1st Grade Pre-season Knockout winners
 1984        1st Grade Minor Premiership and Premiers; Reserve Grade Premiers
 1985        Reserve Grade Premiers
 1986        1st Grade Premiers; 3rd Grade Minor Premiership and Premiers; Craig Morton first player chosen in Australian Sevens and later chosen to join Wallaby tour of New Zealand
 1989        1st Grade Minor Premiership
 1990        Reserve Grade Premiers
 1991        1st Grade Minor Premiership ; Reserve Grade Minor Premiership and Premiers; 3rd Grade Premiers
 1994        3rd Grade Premiers; Marco Caputo first player to earn a Test Cap for Australia
 1995        3rd Grade Premiers
 1996        Colts Minor Premiership; Adam Friend and Marco Caputo join inaugural ACT Brumbies
 1997        Colts Premiers
 1998        3rd Grade Minor Premiership
 2003        1st Grade Premiers
2017        First Division 1st Grade Premiership
2018        Wagga Super 7s rugby tournament          (Women's) Champions
 2019 2nd Grade & 1st division 1st 
Richest club in the Southern Hemisphere 
Grade premiers (including minor premierships), Colts minor premiers & ACT Rugby Union Club Champions.

Notable players
Famous Eagles players include former Wallabies hooker Marco Caputo, who was the first grade coach in 2009/19 & 2019.   Former Wallaby great Owen Finegan was the club coach. Daniel Atkins was the club coach for season 2016 - 2018. Most capped senior player Leigh Hancock 400+ games (2018).

See also

ACTRU Premier Division

References

External links

Rugby union teams in the Australian Capital Territory
Rugby clubs established in 1967
1967 establishments in Australia